Old City often refers to old town, the historic or original core of a city or town.

Old City may refer to several places:

Historical cities or regions of cities 
(by country)
Old City (Baku), Azerbaijan
Old City (Dhaka), Bangladesh, also called Old Dhaka
Old Quebec, Canada, also called Old City
Old City (Shanghai), China
Old City (Cairo), Egypt
Old City, Bristol, England
Old City of Freiburg, Germany
Old City (Hyderabad, India)
Old City (Jaffa), Israel
Old City (Jerusalem)  
Old Town, Oslo, Norway
Old City (Hyderabad, Sindh), Pakistan
Old City, Lahore, Pakistan
Old City, Gaza, Palestine
Old City (Zamość), Poland
Old town, Stockholm, Sweden
Old City (Bern), Switzerland
Old City of Zuoying, Taiwan
Eskişehir (Old City), Turkey
Near Northeast, Washington, D.C., United States, historically called Old City
Old City, Knoxville, Tennessee, United States
Old City, Philadelphia, Pennsylvania, United States
Old City District, a district of the Amanat Al Asimah Governorate, Yemen

Other
Old City Cemetery (disambiguation)
Old City Gaol, Bristol, England
Old City Hall (disambiguation)
Old City Waterworks, Tallahassee, Florida, United States

See also
Old Town (disambiguation)
Oldtown (disambiguation)
New City (disambiguation)